Sabal uresana, commonly known as the Sonoran palmetto, is a species of palm tree that is native to the foothills of the Sierra Madre Occidental in northwestern Mexico (states of Chihuahua and Sonora). The specific epithet, "uresana", refers to Ures, Sonora, a town within its range. It is threatened by habitat loss.

References

uresana
Plants described in 1900
Trees of Chihuahua (state)
Trees of Sonora
Vulnerable plants
Flora of the Sierra Madre Occidental
Taxonomy articles created by Polbot
Taxa named by William Trelease